McKinley Road is a tree-lined avenue linking the central business districts of Makati and Bonifacio Global City, Taguig in Metro Manila, Philippines. It is a continuation of Ayala Avenue, south of Epifanio de los Santos Avenue (EDSA), which runs for approximately  through the affluent neighborhoods of Forbes Park and Dasmariñas Village. It is home to the exclusive Manila Polo Club and the Manila Golf and Country Club.

McKinley Road has a residential character dominated by mansions with high walls and elaborate gates. At its centerpiece is the Spanish Mission style Santuario de San Antonio Parish church that faces the San Antonio Plaza, the main public square of Forbes Park. A small arcade stands on the opposite side of the plaza which houses a Rustan's grocery, a gourmet deli, a few cafés, and a bookstore. The rest of Forbes Park on both sides of McKinley is closed to non-residents.

Route description

The intersection at 5th Avenue is dominated by the Fairway Tower, a luxury condominium on the border of Bonifacio district. The road winds past the southern edge of the Manila Golf Course as it heads toward the club's entrance at Harvard Road. The Manila Polo Club entrance is on the southern side of McKinley opposite the golf course on a small side street not far from Harvard. Continuing a further  as the road bends slightly to the northwest, it reaches the San Antonio Plaza of Forbes Park. From Banyan Street just past the Plaza to Epifanio de los Santos Avenue (EDSA), McKinley marks the eastern boundary of Dasmariñas Village. The road terminates at EDSA, between a Shell gas station and the McKinley Exchange Corporate Center.

West of EDSA, the road resumes as Ayala Avenue as it heads into the heart of Ayala Center and the Makati CBD. In the Bonifacio Global City east of 5th Avenue, it continues as the McKinley Parkway, which heads east to the Serendra mixed-use development and the SM Aura Premier and Market! Market! shopping malls.

History
The road originally served as a northwest–southeast route between Fort William McKinley and Pasay, then in the province of Rizal, known as Pasay–McKinley Road, Manila-Makati-Fort McKinley Road, and other various names recognized by the government per section, alongside the present-day Antonio Arnaiz Avenue. It also formed part of Route 57 or Highway 57. The road eastern terminus was the Carabao Gate at the entrance to the Fort, on what is now the intersection with 5th Avenue. The road became disconnected in the 1950s when the Makati Commercial Center complex (now Glorietta complex at Ayala Center) was built over its section between Highway 54 (now EDSA) and Makati Avenue. The section between Highway 54 and Fort Bonifacio was then realigned to continue Ayala Avenue and became a separate road subsequently named for the U.S. military reservation to which it leads, which was, in turn, named after William McKinley, the 25th President of the United States, responsible for the U.S. colonization of the Philippines in 1898. 

There are two other streets in the area named McKinley: McKinley Parkway, an extension of McKinley Road in Bonifacio Global City; and Upper McKinley Road, an unrelated road on McKinley Hill further south on Lawton Avenue in Fort Bonifacio.

Transportation
Bonifacio Transport Corporation provides bus service (called BGC Bus) along McKinley Road to different points within Bonifacio Global City from its terminal at the McKinley Exchange Corporate Center on EDSA beside the Ayala MRT Station.

Jeepneys bound for Washington Street in Pio del Pilar and Fort Bonifacio Gate 2 ply this road. These stop at the terminals adjacent to the road's intersection with EDSA, respectively.

Landmarks

 Holy Trinity Church Manila, an Anglican church in Forbes Park
 Fairway Tower
 Manila American Cemetery and Memorial
 Manila Polo Club
 McKinley Exchange Corporate Center
 San Antonio Plaza
 San Antonio Plaza Arcade
 Santuario de San Antonio Parish

See also
 Ayala Avenue

References

Streets in Metro Manila